The awarding of a flitch of bacon to married couples who can swear to not having regretted their marriage for a year and a day is an old tradition, the remnants of which still survive in some pockets in England.  The tradition was maintained at Wychnor Hall in Staffordshire  until at least the eighteenth century, but now the flitch required to be held remains only as a carving over the fireplace.  At Little Dunmow in Essex a similar ceremony also survived into the eighteenth century.  The tradition can be traced back to at least the fourteenth century at both sites and the Dunmow flitch is referred to in Chaucer.  The awarding of a flitch at both sites seems to have been an exceedingly rare event.

The Dunmow tradition was revived in Victorian times, largely inspired by a book (The Flitch of Bacon) by William Harrison Ainsworth.  Flitch trials are still held in modern times at Great Dunmow.  A counsel is employed to cross-examine the nominated couples and attempt to show they are undeserving of the award.

There is evidence that the flitch of bacon tradition existed outside Britain in mainland Europe and some would push its origins back as far as Saxon times.  Historian Hélène Adeline Guerber associates the origins of the flitch of bacon ceremony with the Yule feast of Norse tradition in which boar meat is eaten in honour of the god Freyr.

Whichnoure

The manor of Whichnoure (now Wychnor Hall) near Lichfield, Staffordshire was granted to Sir Philip de Somerville in the 10th year of the reign of Edward III (1336) from the Earl of Lancaster for a small fee but also on condition that he kept ready "arrayed at all times of the year but Lent, one bacon-flyke hanging in his hall at Whichnoure, to be given to every man or woman who demanded it a year and a day after the marriage, upon their swearing they would not have changed for none other".

The couple are required to produce two of their neighbours to witness that the oath is true.  The oath that was to be sworn by the couple reads,

Hear ye, Sir Philip de Somervile, lord of Whichenoure, maintainer and giver of this Bacon, that I, (husband), syth I wedded (wife), my wyfe, and syth I had her in my kepyng and at wylle, by a Yere and a Day after our Marryage, I would not have changed for none other, farer ne fowler, richer ne powrer, ne for none other descended of gretter lynage, sleeping ne waking, at noo time; and if the said (wife) were sole, and I sole, I would take her to be my wyfe before all the wymen of the worlde, of what condytions soevere they be, good or evyle, as helpe me God, and his Seyntys, and this flesh, and all fleshes.

The winning couple are escorted away in a grand ceremony with "trompets, tabourets, and other manoir of mynstralcie".  Although this is a valuable prize, it does not seem to have been claimed very often.  Horace Walpole, who visited Whichnoure in 1760, reported that the flitch had not been claimed for thirty years and that a real flitch of bacon was no longer kept ready at the manor.  A replacement, carved in wood, was now displayed over the mantle of the fireplace in the main hall, presumably in order to continue to meet the conditions of the original land grant.

Walpole was quite taken by this tradition and mentions it in several letters to his friends.  In a letter to the Countess of Ailesbury (Lady Caroline Campbell, daughter of John Campbell, 4th Duke of Argyll and widow of Charles Bruce, 4th Earl of Elgin and 3rd Earl of Ailesbury but by this stage married to Hon. H. S. Conway), Walpole with tongue firmly in cheek berates her for not having come to Whichnoure to claim the flitch: "Are you not ashamed, Madam, never to have put in your claim? It is above a year and a day that you have been married, and I never once heard either of you mention a journey to Whichnoure."  Describing the location and explaining why the flitch no longer gets claimed, he writes "... it is a little paradise, and the more like an antique one, as, by all I have said, the married couples seem to be driven out of it."  Walpole concludes, "If you love a prospect, or bacon, you will certainly come hither."

An anonymous humorous piece appeared in Joseph Addison's Spectator in 1714 purporting to explain the rarity of the flitch being awarded in terms of the poor quality of the applicants.  The writer claims that the source is the Register of Whichenovre-hall but the truth is that the piece is almost certainly entirely fictitious.  The first couple to claim, according to this account, were at first successful, but then had the flitch taken away from them after they began to argue about how it should be dressed.  Another couple failed when the husband, who had only reluctantly attended, had his ears boxed by his wife during the questioning.  A couple who applied after only their honeymoon had finished passed the questioning but since insufficient time had elapsed were awarded just one rasher.  One of only two couples to be successful in the first century of the tradition was a ship's captain and his wife who had not actually seen one another for over a year since their marriage.

As well as to married couples, a flitch of bacon was also given at Whichnoure to men in the religious profession one year and a day following their retirement.

Dunmow

A rather better-known example of the awarding of a flitch of bacon to married couples occurred at Little Dunmow Priory in Essex.  It is generally held to have been instituted by the family of Robert Fitzwalter in the 13th century.  According to Rev. W. W. Skeat, in his notes to the fourteenth-century religious poem Piers Plowman by William Langland, In the present passage we have the earliest known allusion to the singular custom known as that of "the Dunmow flitch of Bacon." The custom was—"that if any pair could, after a twelvemonth of matrimony, come forward, and make oath at Dunmow [co. Essex] that, during the whole time, they had never had a quarrel, never regretted their marriage, and, if again open to an engagement, would make exactly that they had made, they should be rewarded with a flitch of Bacon."  It is referred to in the Prologue to the Wife of Bath's Tale by Geoffrey Chaucer (c.1343–1400), in a way that makes clear the reference would already be well known to the reader.  It continued to be awarded until the middle of the 18th century, the last successful claim being made on 20 June 1751.  The ceremony of this last flitch award was recorded by the artist David Ogborne who was present at the time to make sketches and, later, engravings.  His images were later used as source material by William Harrison Ainsworth for his novel, The Flitch of Bacon.  Ainsworth's 1854 novel proved so popular that it revived the custom which has continued in one form or another down to the present day and is now held every leap year.

The oath to be taken was very similar to the one at Whichnoure, that "neither of them in a year and a day, neither sleeping or waking, repented of their marriage".  The couple are required to kneel on sharp stones in the churchyard while taking the oath and a verse was chanted:

You shall swear by custom of confession,
That you ne'er made nuptial transgression;
Nor, since you were married man and wife,
By household brawls, or contentious strife,
Or otherwise at bed or board,
Offended each other in deed or in word,
Or since the parish clerk said, Amen,
Wished yourselves unmarried again,
Or in twelvemonth and a day,
Repented in thought any way,
But continue true in thought and desire,
As when you joined hands in holy quire.
If to these conditions without all fear,
Of your own accord you will freely swear,
A whole gammon of bacon you shall receive,
And bear it hence with love and good leave:
For this is our custom at Dunmow well known,
Tho' the pleasure be ours, the bacon's your own.Percy, pp.177-178.

Following the taking of the oath, the couple are then paraded around the town with their bacon in a noisy ceremony, much as at Whichnoure.

The historical Dunmow flitch is known to have been successfully claimed only a total of six times, although there may have been more that are unknown (among the possible ones there are Montagu Burgoyne and his wife Elizabeth).  Three are known prior to the dissolution of the monasteries from the records of the house of Sir Richard St George, and a further three awards are known from the records of the manor court at Dunmow now in the British Museum.  There was a long gap after the dissolution, but the tradition was revived by Sir Thomas May in 1701 when he became the owner of the Priory.

There was an attempt made to claim the flitch on 12 June 1772 by John and Susan Gilder.  The couple had given due notice of their claim and were accompanied by a large crowd of onlookers.  However, the lord of the manor had ordered that the ceremony should not take place, and the gates of the Priory were nailed shut to prevent it.  By 1809 the tradition was definitely abolished.  A further attempt to claim the flitch was made in 1832 by Josiah Vine, a retired cheesemaker, who travelled with his wife from Reading to make his claim.   He too was refused a trial by a very unsympathetic Steward of Little Dunmow.  John Bull on 8 October 1837 reported that it had been revived by the Saffron Walden and Dunmow Agricultural Society.  Apparently however, this flitch was merely distributed at the annual society dinner.  In 1851 a couple from Felstead were also refused a trial at the Priory, but obtained a flitch from the people of nearby Great Dunmow who felt that they deserved it.

Modern flitch trials 

The flitch trials were revived in the Victorian era after the publication of Ainsworth's novel in 1854 which proved to be tremendously popular.  Ainsworth aided the reinstitution by himself donating two flitches for the first of the revived ceremonies in 1855.  They have been held ever since in one form or another except for a gap caused by the World Wars.  The first ceremony after World War II was held in 1949, despite rationing still being in force.  The modern trials are held every fourth year on leap years but the 2020 trials were postponed until 2022 due to the COVID-19 pandemic. The event is organised by the Dunmow Flitch Trials Committee who employ a counsel to cross-examine the applicants in an attempt to save the bacon for the sponsors who donated it.  The trial is decided by a jury.

When first revived the original stones on which the couple knelt had been removed and the chair on which they were carried if successful is kept permanently in Little Dunmow Priory, also known as St Mary's Church. However, replacements for both of these have been provided for the modern ceremony.  The modern trials are held in the town of Great Dunmow rather than the location of the original custom at Little Dunmow, a smaller nearby village.

Dunmow claims to be the only location to have continued the flitch of bacon custom into the 21st century.

Older traditions 

Although the flitch ceremony at Dunmow is generally held to have originated with the Fitzwalters in the 13th century there are some who would date it to earlier Norman or Saxon times, one suggested date being 1104, the founding of the Little Dunmow Priory.  This is partly because the flitch of Dunmow seems to have already been common knowledge in very early works such as the prologue to Chaucer's "Wife of Bath" and also in the Visions of Pierce Plowman by William Langland.  Some would also read passages in the Anglo-Saxon Chronicle as alluding to the Dunmow flitch.

It is possible that the flitch of bacon custom was at one time quite widespread.  There was a flitch of bacon tradition at the Abbey of St Melaine, Rennes, Brittany, where the bacon is said to have hung for six centuries without being claimed.  In Vienna, there was a similar tradition in which the prize was a ham of bacon rather than a flitch.  The ham was hung over the city gate, from where the winner was expected to climb up and remove it himself.  One such winner had the prize revoked after winning it, after he inadvertently let slip that his wife would rebuke him for staining his coat while bringing down the ham.

Historian Hélène Adeline Guerber theorizes that the tradition traces back to an ancient Norse custom connected with the Yule feast, a Germanic pagan festival that in modern times has inextricably been absorbed into Christmas.  Guerber theorizes that Yule is primarily dedicated to the god Thor, but is also important for the god Freyr (who rides a wild boar, Gullinbursti).  A boar is eaten at Yule in Freyr's honour and the boar can only be carved by a man of unstained reputation.  Guerber says that Freyr was the patron of gladness and harmony and was often invoked by married couples who wished for the same, and that this led to the custom of married couples who actually succeeded in living in harmony for a given period being rewarded with a piece of boar meat.  Guerber states that it is this tradition that became the flitch of bacon custom after converting boar meat into bacon.

In the arts and culture
The flitch of bacon, subtitled The custom of Dunmow: a tale of English home is a novel by William Harrison Ainsworth first published in 1854.  The central plot of the story is the flitch at Dunmow and the scheming by the leading character to be awarded it by marrying a succession of women in an attempt to find the right one.  The description of the ceremony in the book is partly based on the art of David Ogborne, an eyewitness to the last ceremony in 1751.

The Flitch of Bacon public house, of which the protagonist of Ainsworth's novel is the publican, still exists in Little Dunmow.

The Flitch of Bacon is a comic opera from 1779 by William Shield and Sir Henry Bate Dudley.

Made in Heaven is a 1952 film starring David Tomlinson and Petula Clark about a married couple attempting to win the Dunmow flitch.

Dunmow Flitch is the instrumental theme song to the French television series Bonne Nuit les Petits which premiered in 1962 and was remade in 1994. The series was created by Claude Laydu.

See also

References

Bibliography
William Harrison Ainsworth,  The flitch of bacon, B. Tauchnitz, 1854.
John Brand, Sir Henry Ellis (ed), Observations on the popular antiquities of Great Britain: chiefly illustrating the origin of our vulgar and provincial customs, ceremonies, and superstitions, vol.2, Bohn, 1854.
H. A. Guerber, Myths of the Norsemen: from the eddas and the sagas, Courier Dover Publications, 1992 .
George Monger, Marriage customs of the world: from henna to honeymoons, ABC-CLIO, 2004 .
Reuben Percy and Sholto Percy, The Percy anecdotes: original and select, Vol.12, J. Cumberland, 1826.
 Ronay, Gabriel (1978), The Tartar Khan's Englishman (London: Cassel) 
Horace Walpole, John Wright (ed.),  The Letters of Horace Walpole: Earl of Orford, vol.3, Lea and Blanchard, 1842.

External links
Dunmow Flitch Trials official site

Bacon
English traditions